Wolverine: Manifest Destiny is a four-issue comic book limited series starring Wolverine and published by Marvel Comics. The series was written by Jason Aaron with art by Stephen Segovia and colored by John Rauch. It is a part of X-Men: Manifest Destiny

Plot summary
After the return of his memory, Logan returns to San Francisco's Chinatown to settle a fifty-year-old score.

Reception
IGN gave the first issue a 7.2 out of ten and the final issue a 7.8.

Merchandise
Dave Wilkins's cover art for the first issue was used on a Wolverine themed computer mouse.

Collected editions

References

2008 comics debuts
Comics by Jason Aaron